Carex litvinovii is a tussock-forming perennial in the family Cyperaceae. It is native to parts of Central Asia.

See also
 List of Carex species

References

litvinovii
Plants described in 1903
Taxa named by Georg Kükenthal
Flora of Uzbekistan
Flora of Kyrgyzstan
Flora of Kazakhstan